The 2019 Samoa assassination plot was an alleged attempt to assassinate Samoan Prime Minister Tuila'epa Sa'ilele Malielegaoi. The plot was revealed to the public by Police Commissioner, Fuiavailiili Egon Keil on 13 August 2019. One person was subsequently convicted of conspiracy to murder. Legal proceedings are still ongoing against two other suspects, and a fourth man is currently awaiting extradition from Australia.

Arrests
On 16 August 2019 police announced they had arrested three people on charges of conspiracy to commit murder. The arrests were made after a tipoff from the village council of Lauli'i. After an initial hearing on 26 August, two of the suspects - blogger Malele Atofu Paulo and teacher Lema'i Faioso Sione - appeared in court on 3 September and pleaded not guilty. On 4 September Samoan police announced they were attempting to extradite a fourth man, Talalelei Pauga, from Australia.

On 9 September 2019, Leiloa, Paulo and Sione appeared in court together for the first time. Paulo and Sione entered a not-guilty plea, while Leiloa pleaded guilty to a charge of conspiring to commit murder. All the accused were remanded in custody. On 28 February 2020 Paulo and Sione were granted bail. Security around Tuilaepa was increased as a result. On 23 July 2020, the Supreme Court refused permission for Sione and Paulo to return to Australia. Both are Australian residents.

In February 2023 the Samoan government requested a further delay in the trial of Paulo and Sione so that they could be tried alongside Pauga, who was still in Australia. They also requested a delay to withdraw the charges against one party, so they could testify for the prosecution. The court refused to grant a delay and the case was scheduled for trial. The trial began on 13 March 2013.

Change and re-change of plea of Taualai Leiloa
However due to be sentenced on 30 September, his sentencing was postponed until 14 October 2019. When Taualai Leiloa appeared before the Court to be sentenced, the prosecution asked the judge that Leiloa have a lawyer to represent him. The judge agreed due to the seriousness of the charges against him. However, Leiloa alleged he couldn't afford a lawyer, for which his sentence was postponed until 1 November while they seek legal counsel for him.

On 1 November 2019, when he was due to be sentenced, Leiloa asked the judge to change his plea from guilty to not-guilty, after being advised by his lawyer. On 23 December 2020 Leiloa was sentenced to five years imprisonment.

Talalelei Pauga extradition proceedings
On 20 August 2020 Australian Federal Police officer Natalie Marks arrested Brisbane man Talalelei Pauga for extradition to Samoa. He was remanded at Arthur Gorrie Correctional Centre pending assessment of eligibility for extradition.  A subsequent challenge before the Federal Court of Australia saw the Australian Federal Police ordered to investigate Pauga's arrest and why he was detained without access to a lawyer for a month. Proceedings are underway in the Federal Court of Australia before the Honourable Justice Colvin seeking to quash the remands made by the Brisbane Magistrates Court. On 16 September 2021,  Faatasi Puleiata Veataui withdrew the Samoan warrant for the arrest of Mr Pauga which he had previously issued on 25 February 2020. Samoa now finds itself in the position of having made a request to Australia for the extradition of Mr Pauga when there is no warrant for his arrest in Samoa. Samoa has nevertheless opposed granting bail to Mr Pauga. On 1 October 2021 in a hearing before Justice Colvin, Samoa Queens Counsel for Samoa unsuccessfully sought to prevent an adjournment of bail proceedings which Mr Pauga sought in order to bring further evidence about conditions within the Queensland prison system. On 16 September 2022 the Federal Court of Australia set aside a determination that Pauga was eligible for extradition. Despite this, Pauga remained in custody.

References

2019 crimes in Oceania
Assassination plot
August 2019 crimes in Oceania
August 2019 events in Oceania
Conspiracies
2019 assassination plot
Failed assassination attempts